Dead Man's Hand is a 2007 film directed by Charles Band.

Plot
After inheriting a casino from his dead uncle, Matthew Dragna, his girl friend JJ (Robin Sydney) and a group of friends take a road trip to the outskirts of Las Vegas, where they find the run-down Mysteria Casino. But the trip takes a frightening turn when the kids discover that the casino is haunted by the ghosts of Vegas mobsters Roy "The Word" Donahue (Sid Haig) and his goon Gil Wachetta (Michael Berryman), looking to settle an old score. Matthew and J.J. must fight for their very souls as the ghosts seek their gruesome vengeance, and in the vein of The Shining, this horrifying tale builds to a bloody and surprising climax.

References

External links
 

2007 films
American horror films
Films directed by Charles Band
2007 horror films
2000s English-language films
2000s American films